Delancey (also spelled De Lancey, DeLancey, or Delancy) is a hamlet in Delaware County, New York, United States. Delancey had a post office until January 3, 2004; it still has its own ZIP code, 13752.

References

Hamlets in Delaware County, New York
Hamlets in New York (state)